Sushila Tiriya, is a social worker and a politician from the Indian National Congress party, who was a Member of the Parliament of India representing Odisha in the Rajya Sabha(on year 1986 and again on year 2006) the upper house of the Indian Parliament. She was elected in the Lok Sabha, the lower house, in 1994 (10th Lok Sabha) and re-elected in 1996(11th Lok Sabha)

.

Family and education 
Sushila Tiriya belongs to a freedom fighters family. Her father, Shri Rupnarayan Tiriya, opened a school and took keen interest in educating the tribal community.

She graduated from Utkal University with a B.A. degree.

Political career 
At the age of 24, Sushila Tiriya joined the Youth Congress (I) and became its President and Vice-president in 1983 and 1984 respectively, from Mayurbhanj District, Odisha.

In 1986, she was elected to Rajya Sabha. During her term, she served as Member in the Consultative Committees of Ministry of Science and Technology, Atomic Energy and Ocean Development in 1986–87, Ministry of Civil Aviation in 1987–88, and Ministry of Communications in 1988–89.

From 1987 to 1993, she served as the General Secretary of the Indian Youth Congress. She was a member of the committees on Government Assurances (1988–89) and Welfare of Scheduled Castes and Scheduled Tribes (1989-92).

In 1994, she contested in the tenth Lok Sabha elections for an ST seat and won from Mayurbhanj. During that term, she served as Member of Consultative Committees of Ministry of Science and Technology, Forest and Environment, and Ministry of Food and Civil Supplies, from 1994 to 1996.

From 1995 onwards, she served as the Joint Secretary of All India Congress Committee, along with getting re-elected as a Lok Sabha member in 1996.

Social work 
Sushila Tiriya has special interests in the upliftment of rural poor tribals as well as the unemployed youth. She is associated with tribal organisations, namely, `SUGAR'; `Swayan Vikas Samity' and Rural Youth Tribals Development Association. She also organises two sports events in village Kaluakhaman through tribal association every year to encourage the tribal youth to improve their ability in sports field in Distt. Mayurbhanj.

References

External links
 Profile on Rajya Sabha website
 Profile of Lok Sabha members

1956 births
Living people
People from Mayurbhanj district
Rajya Sabha members from Odisha
India MPs 1991–1996
Lok Sabha members from Odisha
Indian National Congress politicians from Odisha
Women in Odisha politics
20th-century Indian women politicians
20th-century Indian politicians
India MPs 1996–1997
Women members of the Lok Sabha
Women members of the Rajya Sabha